Kornica is a village in Bosnia and Herzegovina in the Republika Srpska entity's municipality of Šamac.

Demographics

Ethnic composition, 1991 census
total: 830

 Croats - 802 (96.62%)
 Serbs - 8 (0.96%)
 Yugoslavs - 2 (0.24%)
 Bosniaks - 1 (0.12%)
 others and unknown - 17 (2.04%)

References
 Official results from the book: Ethnic composition of Bosnia-Herzegovina population, by municipalities and settlements, 1991. census, Zavod za statistiku Bosne i Hercegovine - Bilten no.234, Sarajevo 1991.

External links
 Satellite images of Kornica
 Website of refugees from Kornica

Villages in Republika Srpska
Populated places in Šamac, Bosnia and Herzegovina